Charles A. Hartke is an American politician who served as Director of the Illinois Department of Agriculture and as a Democratic member of the Illinois House of Representatives.

Biography
Hartke was born May 7, 1944 in Effingham, Illinois. He served in the United States Army from 1966 to 1968, including a tour of duty in Vietnam. He served on the Effingham County Board from 1971-1974, as Effingham County Democratic Central Committee Chairman from 1978-1985 and as president of the Effingham County Pork Producers for a period of time. He was appointed to the Illinois House of Representatives February 11, 1985 to replace Richard H. Brummer, who was appointed to a judgeship. In 1997, Hartke was appointed Assistant Majority Leader. He was an elector pledged to Al Gore during the 2000 presidential election. In 2003, Rod Blagojevich appointed him Director of the Illinois Department of Agriculture. William J. Grunloh was appointed to succeed him. He officially stepped down from the position February 29, 2008.

References

1944 births
Living people
People from Effingham, Illinois
Military personnel from Illinois
County board members in Illinois
21st-century American politicians
Democratic Party members of the Illinois House of Representatives